Short Dog's in the House is the sixth studio album by American rapper Too Short. The album was released on September 11, 1990, via Jive Records. The CD contains a number of both socially conscious songs, as well as dirty rap and sexually-explicit songs that have made Too Short famous. The album's production samples a number of classic P-funk records, as well as the heavy use of the Roland TR-808 for instrumentation. The laid-back beats (which Shaw himself dubbed "dope fiend beats") would be a major influence in hip hop years later (and would help cement Too Short's legacy as a pioneer of West coast hip hop), and the album was key in the development of West Coast born G-funk that dominated the charts for the next few years. The album's cover was an influence for the cover art for Snoop Dogg's Doggystyle, just as Too Short's drawl-heavy delivery had influenced Snoop Dogg's vocal style. Upon release, the album received a number of positive reviews, which helped it reach the highest position on the U.S. R&B charts, of any of Too Short's albums, at the time.

The album featured a guest appearance by Ice Cube, and was the first time major rap artists from both Northern and Southern California collaborated on a song. The production of the album was handled mostly by a number of local Oakland-based producers (including Al Eaton, who was also known for his later work with Queen Latifah), but also received production from two of Ice Cube's producers, Sir Jinx and DJ Pooh. The edited version removes two songs and adds the song "What Rap?" On the edited version, "Ain't Nothin' but a Word to Me" was censored with bleep sound effects. Swearing is removed from other songs as well.

Background and Conception
Too Short had received critical acclaim with his release of Life Is... Too Short, which had transformed the Oakland emcee from an underground rapper to one of the West Coast's most notable faces. The album spawned an album-titled single, which reached #7 on Billboard'''s 200 Hot Rap Singles, while the album itself peaked at #37 on the Billboard 200.

Prior to the release of the album, there were a number of rumors that Too Short was killed in a crackhouse while smoking cocaine. Too Short released this album partly as a response to those rumors, and the rumors would later be addressed on the song "Dead or Alive".

Part of the direction of the album was influenced by Too Short's real surroundings in Oakland. The early 1990s were the peak of the crack epidemic, and Oakland was one of the hardest-hit cities. The back cover for the album sponsored the Stop the Violence Movement. Too Short released "The Ghetto" as a response to the plight of the inner cities, and the song would go on to receive heavy radio airplay across the United States. Donnie Hathaway's friend Roberta Flack thanked Too Short for honoring Hathaway's single of the same name.

Track listing

 Notes
 "It's Your Life" was included on the Boyz n the Hood'' soundtrack.
 On the cassette version of the album, "The Ghetto" is extended to 5:58, which features a segment of one of the Last Poets' speeches "Die Nigga". After Too Short's 4th verse, he says "For all you brothas runnin' around here usin' that "n-word", lets the original rappers kick the last verse", for which then the segment comes in. This part is omitted on compact disc, but can be found on the 12 inch single.
 On the clean version of the album, "Ain't Nothin' But A Word" is bleep censored, making the song virtually impossible to comprehend, with "Pimpology" &  "Paula and Janet" completely omitted from the tracklisting.
 "Pimpology" contains several samples from the Oakland-based Blaxploitation film, The Mack.

 Samples
"It's Your Life" - Contains a sample of "Dr. Funkenstein" by Parliament and "Life is Too Short" by Too Short"
"Short But Funky" - Contains a sample of "High" by Skyy
"Dead or Alive" - Contains a sample of "Aqua Boogie (A Psychoalphadiscobetabioaquadoloop)" by Parliament
"Ain't Nothin' But a Word to Me" - Contains a sample of "Hit or Miss" by Odetta
"Hard on the Boulevard" - Contains a sample of "Fopp" by Ohio Players
"Paula & Janet" - Contains a sample of "Sister Sanctified" by Stanley Turrentine/Milt Jackson and "Take the Money and Run" by Steve Miller Band
"Rap Like Me" - Contains a sample of "Slow Dance" by Stanley Clarke

Charts

Weekly charts

Year-end charts

References

1990 albums
Albums produced by DJ Pooh
Too Short albums
Jive Records albums
G-funk albums